Somabrachys aegrota is a moth in the family Somabrachyidae. It was described by Johann Christoph Friedrich Klug in 1830. It occurs in North Africa, Spain and on Sicily. Larvae feed on Cistaceae.

References

Zygaenoidea
Moths described in 1830
Moths of Africa
Moths of Europe
Taxa named by Johann Christoph Friedrich Klug